Francis 'Frank' Findlay (4 February 1920 — 16 June 1963) was a Scottish first-class cricketer and rugby union player.

Findlay was born in February 1920 at Rubislaw, Aberdeenshire. He was educated at Robert Gordon's College, before matriculating to the University of Aberdeen. A member of the Aberdeen University Officers' Training Corps, Findlay was injured during training at Aboyne in July 1939. A club cricketer for Aberdeenshire, Findlay made two appearances in first-class cricket for Scotland in 1948, against Warwickshire at Edgbaston, and Ireland at Glasgow. He scored 9 runs in his two matches. In addition to playing cricket, Findlay also played rugby union for Gordonians RFC. 

He was by profession a schoolteacher, securing a scholastic appointment in Anglo-Egyptian Sudan in 1950, which bought an end to his international cricket career. He had returned to Scotland by 1953 and resumed playing for Aberdeenshire. Findlay was killed in a car accident at Kilmarnock on 16 June 1963. His brother, Tom, was also a first-class cricketer.

References

External links
 

1920 births
1963 deaths
Cricketers from Aberdeen
People educated at Robert Gordon's College
Alumni of the University of Aberdeen
Scottish cricketers
Scottish rugby union players
Gordonians RFC players
Scottish schoolteachers
Road incident deaths in Scotland